James Cottington was an Anglican priest in the late 16th and early 17th centuries.

Cottington was  educated at Trinity College, Oxford, graduating BA in 1572, MA in 1575 and BD in 1580.  He became a Fellow of Trinity in 1572. He held livings in East Brent, Ditcheat and Yeovilton. Cottington was  Archdeacon of Surrey from 1580 until his death in 1605.

References

1710 deaths
Alumni of Trinity College, Oxford
Archdeacons of Surrey
16th-century English Anglican priests
17th-century English Anglican priests